John Thompson (March 20, 1749September 30, 1823) was a United States representative from New York.

Biography
Thompson was born in Litchfield in the Connecticut Colony on March 20, 1749.  He attended the common schools, and at the age of fourteen moved with his parents to Stillwater, where he became a farmer.  Thompson served in the American Revolution as a captain, and commanded a company of the 13th Regiment of Albany County Militia, including participation in the Battles of Saratoga.  He was appointed a justice of the peace in 1788 and was a member of the New York State Assembly in 1788 and 1789.

Thompson was elected as a Democratic-Republican to the Sixth Congress, serving from March 4, 1799 to March 3, 1801. He was a delegate to the New York State Constitutional Convention in 1801.  In 1791 Governor George Clinton appointed him first judge of Saratoga County, and he served until 1809.

Thompson was again elected to Congress in 1806, and he served in the Tenth and Eleventh Congresses, March 4, 1807 to March 3, 1811.

He died in Stillwater on September 30, 1823 and was interred at Yellow Meeting House Cemetery in Stillwater.

References

External links

1749 births
1823 deaths
Politicians from Litchfield, Connecticut
People from Stillwater, New York
New York (state) militiamen in the American Revolution
Members of the New York State Assembly
New York (state) state court judges
Democratic-Republican Party members of the United States House of Representatives from New York (state)
Burials in New York (state)
People of colonial Connecticut